The 1845 Georgia gubernatorial election was held on October 6, 1845.

The incumbent governor, George W. Crawford, was re-elected to a second term in office. The election was decided by 1,919 votes.

General election

Candidates

Whig 

 George W. Crawford, incumbent governor.

Democratic 

 Matthew Hall McAllister, former mayor of Savannah.

Results

References 

Georgia (U.S. state) gubernatorial elections
Georgia
Gubernatorial